Anaciaeschna jaspidea is a species of dragonfly in the family Aeshnidae, commonly known as the Australasian duskhawker and Rusty darner. It widely distributed from India through Australia to the Pacific.

Description and habitat
It is a large brown dragonfly with blue eyes. Its thorax is reddish-brown, with two broad greenish-yellow stripes on each side. Wings are transparent with pterostigma, reddish-brown. Abdomen is reddish-brown, marked with azure-blue, white, and yellow. Segment 1 has a large pale yellow spot on each side. Segment 2 has white marks on the sides and azure-blue on the dorsum with a broad spot of reddish-brown on mid-dorsum. Segment 3 to 7 are brown on dorsum with black apical annules. Segments 8 to 10 are darker on dorsum with a pair of dorsal apical spots. Anal appendages are dark reddish-brown. Female is similar to the male.

It is a crepuscular species, flies during dawn and dusk. It is common in marshes surrounded by woods where it breeds.

Note
The Australasian duskhawker, Anaciaeschna jaspidea, should not be confused with almost-similarly named Australian duskhawker, Austrogynacantha heterogena, a different species of Aeshnid dragonfly.

See also
 List of Odonata species of Australia
 List of odonata species of India
 List of odonata of Kerala

References

Aeshnidae
Odonata of Australia
Insects of Australia
Taxa named by Hermann Burmeister
Insects described in 1839